The Scrap Metal Dealers Act 2013 (c. 10) is an Act of the Parliament of the United Kingdom Parliament.uk which repealed the Scrap Metal Dealers Act 1964, certain linked legislation, and Part 1 of Vehicles (Crime) Act 2001 relating to scrap metal dealers. A 2012 amendment to the Scrap Metal Dealers Act 1964, made by section 146 of the Legal Aid, Sentencing and Punishment of Offenders Act 2012 which created the offence of buying scrap metal for cash, was retained and re-enacted.

The intent of the Act is to prevent metal theft that can then be sold on for cash. The over-riding intention is to ensure traceability and create an effective audit trail, and therefore scrap metal dealers will need to take details of the seller and record it rather than pay cash for metal. Payment by cheque or funds transfer is permitted. Exchange of scrap metal for other goods or services is not permitted.

References

United Kingdom Acts of Parliament 2013